= Hangarge =

Hangarge Hangarga
- Village
- Country: India
- State: Karnataka
- District: Belgaum
- Talukas: Belgaum

Languages
  - Official: [Kannada]
  - Local: [Marathi]
- Time zone: UTC+5:30 (IST)
- Postal code: 590008

Hangarge is a village in Belgaum district in the southern state of Karnataka, India.

Hangarge village has got good environmental conditions to live. Village is 8 km from Belgaum. Hangarge village hill is famous for Bauxite mining. The main crop is paddy. commercial crop is Sugar Cane. Cashew Nut, Mango are fruits available in Summer. Having population 2,868 (Census 2011). In the village there are two Govt. Primary & Higher Primary schools I.e. Marathi medium and Kannada medium up to 7th standard. There is Marathi medium High school "Shri Kallamma Devi High School, Hangarge (KDSH)" up to 10th standard. Post is Mandoli near by 2 km from High school. The Village goddess is Shri Kallammadevi on hill. Her worship is done every year with a Grand Festival Celebration on Gudi Padawa (as per Hindu calendar). Literacy is about 60%.
